This list is of the Places of Scenic Beauty of Japan located within the Prefecture of Fukuoka.

National Places of Scenic Beauty
As of 1 August 2019, eight Places have been designated at a national level.

Prefectural Places of Scenic Beauty
As of 1 May 2019, six Places have been designated at a prefectural level.

Municipal Places of Scenic Beauty
As of 1 May 2019, nine Places have been designated at a municipal level.

Registered Places of Scenic Beauty
As of 1 August 2019, two Monuments have been registered (as opposed to designated) as Places of Scenic Beauty at a national level.

See also
 Cultural Properties of Japan
 List of parks and gardens of Fukuoka Prefecture
 List of Historic Sites of Japan (Fukuoka)

References

External links
  Cultural Properties of Fukuoka Prefecture

Tourist attractions in Fukuoka Prefecture
Places of Scenic Beauty